The Last Waltz is the 1976 final concert by The Band and a 1978 film documenting the concert.

The Last Waltz or Last Waltz may also refer to:

Music
 The Last Waltz (operetta) (Der letzte Walzer), a Viennese operetta  by Oscar Straus 1920

Albums
 The Last Waltz (1978 album), a three-LP soundtrack album from the film
 The Last Waltz (2002 album), a four-CD re-release of the 1978 album
 The Last Waltz: The Final Recordings, a 2000 box set by Bill Evans with Marc Johnson and Joe LaBarbera
The Last Waltz, a 1967 album by Engelbert Humperdinck
The Last Waltz, a 1990 album by Daniel O'Donnell
The Last Waltz, a 1997 album by Killdozer

Songs
 "The Last Waltz" (song), by Engelbert Humperdinck, 1967
 "The Last Waltz", by Rodney Crowell from  Diamonds & Dirt, 1988
 "The Last Waltz", by Webb Pierce, 1953
 "Last Waltz", by the Rasmus from Into, 2001
 "Last Waltz", by Twice from Formula of Love: O+T=<3, 2021

Film and television

Film
 The Last Waltz (1927 film), a German silent film directed by Arthur Robison, based on Oscar Straus' operetta
 The Last Waltz (1934 film), a German operetta film directed by Georg Jacoby, based on Oscar Straus' operetta
 The Last Waltz (1936 French film), a French-language operetta film directed by Leo Mittler, based on Oscar Straus' operetta
 The Last Waltz (1936 British film), the English-language version of the French film, also directed by Leo Mittler
 The Last Waltz (1953 film), a German operetta film directed by Arthur Maria Rabenalt, based on Oscar Straus' operetta

Television
 "The Last Waltz" (Californication)
 "The Last Waltz" (The O.C.)